The Tasmania Fire Service (TFS) is the Tasmanian Government agency responsible for fire suppression and control for the state of Tasmania and its surrounding islands.

Established on 1 November 1979 as a result of enacting the Fire Service Act 1979, the TFS superseded the State Fire Authority, the Rural Fires Board and 22 urban fire brigades.

See also

 Bushfires in Australia
 Firefighting
 Australasian Fire and Emergency Service Authorities Council

References

Further reading
 (1977) Tasmanian Year Book Hobart, Tas. Commonwealth Bureau of Census and Statistics, Tasmanian Office. ISSN 0082-2116  pp. 566–567 Fire Prevention and Fire Fighting - for the old system details
 (1982) Tasmanian Year Book Hobart, Tas. Commonwealth Bureau of Census and Statistics, Tasmanian Office. ISSN 0082-2116  pp. 437–438 Fire Prevention and Fire Fighting - for the new system

External links

map of fire station locations

1979 establishments in Australia
Emergency services in Tasmania
Fire and rescue services of Australia